Kal Online is an MMORPG created by the Korean company Inixsoft in February 2004. The player is given a choice of characters of different classes, their appearance customisable. The player can customize various attributes of their character as they progress throughout the game.

Gameplay

Beginning at level one, the player must work their way up through the government positions of the individual classes to gain skills and unlock new quests. Each class has its own strengths and weaknesses.  In order to level up players must kill monsters to gain experience points. Experience points the player gains from killing monsters varies, depending on factors such as player level, monster level, experience events/scrolls etc. With the latest job changes added, there are 6 jobs per class.

Classes

The player is able to choose between four character classes. Currently, only five classes are unlocked for playing. These are Knight, Archer, Magician, Thief, Shaman and Sword Trickster (only available in G2 (New) server). In all classes the players gets to choose a certain job direction. Mainly, this choice will be to pick either an attack class, or a support class.

Combat

Players may use their character to fight monsters and opponents in the same ways; they can use their normal attacks which do not consume magic points, and also can use their special attacks which consume magic points. Monsters give experience and items, which can vary between different monsters.

Player versus Player

Currently there are six events in which players can fight one another. Every PvP mode, except for the 'duel' and 'assassin' mode, gives "Honor points", which the player can use to upgrade their skills, buy new weapons and accessories.

Castle Siege

Castle siege is a mode in the game where one alliance defends the Geum-Oh Castle, whilst three alliances can sign up to attack. The attacking alliances must remove the flag in the middle of the castle, held by the defending alliance. After a flag is hoisted, it must be defended in order to gain the "spawn point" inside the castle.

Destructing Key Points

The goal of this mode is for two teams to destroy towers. After three small towers are taken down, the giant tower can be destroyed. The team who has killed the most opposing players and destroyed the most towers wins.

Protecting Leader

Two guilds fight each other; one is left with the task of defending their own guild leader while he prays. There are a total of three rounds. If a leader is killed, or the round ends, the roles are then reversed and the defenders become the attackers.

Suffering Valley

Two guilds must fight monsters to gain points, higher level monsters are worth more points. Killing opposing players also rewards the winning player's team more points. The team with the most points after 1 hour is declared the winner.

Battlefield Island

Players have to keep as many pillars up as possible. Monsters appear from nests and attack the pillars. There is also an enemy team which can also attack the pillars. Each team has two points, and the middle is neutral ground. If an enemy sets up a pillar, the team who controls the center will lose stats. The team with the most points/bases wins.

Guilds

Groups of players called "Guilds" can be formed in the game and require six players to create. Each guild has a leader and a co-leader - the leader is the founder of the guild, and he can add, remove and rank players in the guild. Each guild has its own name (changeable through using scrolls which are bought through the game's website, using a currency called KalCash). Each guild rank has a customisable title, though the original ranks (in order of highest-to-lowest) are: Leader, SubLeader, Chief, Member, Temporary member.

Servers

The game currently has two international servers: G1 and G2 (New)

Server one (Hanin), has existed since KalOnline opened in 2004 and currently has the most players.  Naraeha was then released two years later. Bango, the third and newest server, had the fewest players, but now its closed. Initially the game was only available in Korea, but due to large popularity in Korea, an international server was later added.

The Kalonline Steam server was closed on 13 September 2017, and GameAgit launched a new server.

External links

 Main Page

References

2004 video games
Massively multiplayer online role-playing games
Video games developed in South Korea
Windows games
Windows-only games